Myrmecodia tuberosa, the ant plant, is an epiphytic plant. The species has a symbiotic relationship with some ant species where ants use the hollow body of the plant as shelter, defend the plant from other insects, and provide nutrients to the plant through their waste.

Gallery

References

External links

Myrmecophytes
Epiphytes
Psychotrieae